Black Madam (real name: Padge-Victoria Windslowe, born Forrest Gordon) is a gothic rapper, unlicensed cosmetic surgeon, and former brothel madam from the United Kingdom, currently on trial for allegedly killing a London breakdancer, Claudia Aderotimi, with an unsafe buttocks injection. The injection involved low-grade industrial silicone, which reportedly leaked through Aderotimi's blood into her liver, brain, and lungs. Windslowe has reportedly also performed buttocks injections on a large number of celebrity clients including Amber Rose and "a lot of girls from VH1". Madam testified that Rose was "like a walking billboard"  and that Windslowe was referred to as "the Michelangelo of butt injections".  She was reportedly also scheduled to operate on Nicki Minaj, but that ended up being cancelled. She also claimed to have operated on the girlfriends of Chris Brown and Mario (singer), and on herself. Madam underwent a sex change in Ecuador in 1994.
Black Madam was released from SCI-Muncy in February 2022.

References

Cosmetic surgery in the United Kingdom